Eddy Posthuma de Boer (30 May 1931 – 25 July 2021) was a Dutch photographer and photojournalist. He worked for a number of Dutch media and as a freelancer. Posthuma de Boer made portraits of writers, musicians, and ordinary people.

Early life
Posthuma de Boer was born in Amsterdam.

Career
He started his career as an assistant with ANP and subsequently worked together with such media as De Volkskrant and Het Parool. As a photographer, he visited over 90 countries, and one time was a travel reporter for the magazine Avenue. He also documented the development of youth culture and paid particular attention to jazz and rock-’n-roll music. He was greatly influenced by Eva Besnyö.

Posthuma de Boer participated in photographic exhibitions, being mostly known for his portraits, of writers, musicians as well as of ordinary people. He was one of the most significant Dutch photographers of the post-WWII generation.

In 1997, Posthuma de Boer was the recipient of Kees Scherer award. In 2020, he had a large solo exhibition at Fotomuseum Den Haag.

Personal life
Since 1961, Posthuma de Boer was married with the singer Henriëtte Klautz. They had two daughters, the photographer Tessa Posthuma de Boer and the writer Eva Posthuma de Boer.

Publications
Amsterdam. Adriaan Morriën and Posthuma de Boer. Leiden, Stafleu, 1959
Carnaval. Bertus Aafjes and Posthuma de Boer. Utrecht: Bruna, 1968
222 Schrijvers. Literaire portretten. Eddy and Tessa Posthuma de Boer. Amsterdam: Bas Lubberhuizen, 2005. 	
Het menselijk bestaan. De wereld van fotograaf Eddy Posthuma de Boer. Eindhoven: Lecturis, 2015. 
Door het oog van de tijd. De Reve-foto's van Eddy Posthuma de Boer. Varik: De Weideblik, 2015. 
Muggen en olfianten. Eddy & Tessa Posthuma de Boer. Amsterdam: Ambo/Anthos, 2020. 
90. Amsterdam: Arguspers, 2021.

References

External links

1931 births
2021 deaths
People from Amsterdam
20th-century Dutch photographers
Dutch photojournalists
Dutch male artists
20th-century Dutch male artists